The Carrizozo volcanic field is a monogenetic volcanic field located in New Mexico, US. The volcanic field consists of two lava flows, the Broken Back flow and the Carrizozo lava flow (Carrizozo Malpais), the second youngest in New Mexico. Both lava flows originated from groups of cinder cones.

Carrizozo Malpais

The Carrizozo Malpais is a large lava flow on the west side of Carrizozo, New Mexico, on the northern part of the Tularosa Basin between Sierra Blanca to the southeast and the Oscura Mountains to the west.

Initial age estimates ranged from 1,000 to 1,500 years ago, but recent cosmogenic dating techniques revealed the eruption date is 5200 ± 700 years ago. The Carrizozo Woman's Club helped protect this state area. 

The lava flow is composed of pāhoehoe lava that spread through lava tubes. The eruptions are estimated to have lasted about three decades, and the extent of the flow reflects this long eruptive duration rather than a high eruption rate.

The highway has several scenic overlooks where it crosses the Malpaís. The entire extent of the flow can be seen from higher elevations to the east on U.S. Route 380.

Broken Back flow
This flow is significantly older than the Carrizozo Malpais, with an age estimated as 100,000 years, based on the degree of weathering and erosion.

Geology
The volcanic field is associated with the Rio Grande Rift, a region of the Earth's crust that is being slowly pulled apart. This produces faulting that provides paths for magma to reach the Earth's surface from its upper mantle. The lavas erupted were mildly alkaline in composition, similar to the nearby Jornada del Muerto, Hillsboro, and Black Mesa flows.

Seismic measurements in the region have detected a possible thermal anomaly associated with the volcanic field.

Notable vents

See also
Jornada del Muerto
Jornada del Muerto Volcano 
List of volcanoes in the United States
Lava plain
Malpaís (landform)

References

External links
NMBGMR Geologic Tour - Carrizozo Malpais

Volcanic fields of New Mexico
Monogenetic volcanic fields
Holocene volcanoes
Inactive volcanoes
Landforms of Lincoln County, New Mexico
Quaternary United States
Malpaíses (landform)
Lava fields
Tularosa Basin
Lava flows